A bekishe, bekeshe, or  ( or ), is a type of frock coat, usually made of black silk or polyester, worn by Hasidic Jews, and by some non-Hasidic Haredi Jews. The bekishe is worn mainly on Shabbos and Jewish holidays, or at weddings and other such events. During the week, it is customary to wear a rekel, made of wool or polyester, looking like a regular double-breasted suit, only longer. Hassidic rabbis who wear a bekishe during the week will wear a more ornate version for Shabbos, often lined with velvet or some color other than or in addition to black.

The New York Times described the Bekeshe as a "fancier Sabbath version" of the Rekel.

History
The bekishe derives from the Hungarian  circa the 16th century, a sort of fur-lined coat with a collar, fastened by clasps. The  was often richly decorated, sometimes with galloon. One force driving caution with use of wool is the Biblical injunction against mixing  it with cotton  (Lev. 19:19; Deut. 22:11).

Design

The bekishe is typically black. There are two main types of bekishe. The glatt (plain, lit. smooth) bekishe is solid colored, and is usually worn for Friday night and Saturday morning prayers. For Shabbos meals, the patterned bekishe, also known as a tish bekishe (table Bekishe), is worn. The tish bekishe is also worn by some during the Shabbos afternoon prayer service and the night after Shabbos. Both can be made of silk, although nowadays it is usually polyester. Some non-Hassidic Orthodox Jews wear a tish bekishe at home during the Shabbos meals. Many Hassidic Rebbes, mainly of Hungarian lineage, wear  with various colors, usually either blue or silver, often with black.

Kaftan

The gold and blue striped garments worn by Yerushalmi Haredim such as Toldos Aharon, Toldos Avrohom Yitzchok, Dushinsky, Neturei Karta, Shomer Emunim, Pinsk-Karlin, Karlin-Stolin, and many but not all in Breslov, as well as other non-affiliated Yerushalmi Haredim such as the Perushim are called kaftans. Those members of these movements centred in Jerusalem or one of the Jerusalem-affiliated suburbs such as Beitar Illit, Ramat Beit Shemesh or Modi'in Illit wear these gold coats. Those who live further away, for example in Bnei Brak, Ashdod or outside of E. Israel, usually wear black  like most other Hasidim, as do some of those who live in Jerusalem.

The gold kaftan is generally worn after marriage; before marriage, either a black bekishe or weekday-style clothing is worn on days when a bekishe is usually worn. Some of those who wear the gold bekishe switch to black on Shabbos afternoon before Mincha; this is seen in, for example, Dushinsky and with many of the Prushim.

Kapoteh
Married Chabad hasidim wear a long black kapoteh (frock coat) instead of a bekishe. The kapoteh or frak, besides its unique waist seam construction, has four buttons in the front (as opposed to six [or eight in Nadvorna - Kretschnef] on the front of a bekishe), as well as slit in the back, which is lacking on the bekishe. The kapoteh can be made of either wool or silk. Although black is the preferred predominant color, other hues can be present, including on the buttonholes.

References

External links
 
 Why the Long Black Coat?

Frock coats
Hasidic clothing